OSCAR II (a.k.a. OSCAR 2) is the second amateur radio satellite launched by Project OSCAR into Low Earth orbit. OSCAR II was launched June 2, 1962, by a Thor-DM21 Agena B launcher from Vandenberg Air Force Base, Lompoc, California. The satellite, a rectangular box weighing , was launched as a secondary payload (ballast) for Corona 43, the fifth launch of a KH-4 satellite.

OSCAR II lasted 18 days, ceasing operation on June 20, 1962, and re-entered June 21, 1962.

OSCAR 2 incorporated certain design changes from the earlier OSCAR 1.

Project OSCAR
Project OSCAR Inc. started in 1960 with the radio amateurs from the TRW Radio Club of Redondo Beach, California, many of whom worked at TRW and defense industries, to investigate the possibility of putting an amateur satellite in orbit. OSCAR stands for Orbiting Satellite Carrying Amateur Radio.
Project OSCAR was responsible for the construction of the first amateur radio satellite, OSCAR-1, successfully launched from Vandenberg AFB in California. OSCAR-1 orbited the earth for 22 days, transmitting the "HI" greeting in Morse code (four dots, then two dots .... ..). Project Oscar was responsible for launching three other amateur radio satellites during the 1960s: OSCAR 1, OSCAR 3, and OSCAR 4.

In 1969, AMSAT-NA was founded by radio amateurs working at NASA's Goddard Space Flight Center and the Baltimore-Washington DC region, to continue the efforts begun by Project OSCAR. Its first project was to coordinate the launch of Australis-OSCAR 5, constructed by students at the University of Melbourne.

Over fifty years later, Project OSCAR's mission is "To initiate and support activities that promote the Satellite Amateur Radio Hobby". Its primary goal is to reach out and provide logistical support, training and in some cases equipment to amateur radio associations, schools and the public at large.

See also

 OSCAR
 OSCAR 3

References

 Project OSCAR

Amateur radio satellites
Satellites orbiting Earth
Secondary payloads
Spacecraft launched in 1962